Buthidaung is a town in Rakhine State, in the westernmost part of Myanmar (Burma). It is the administrative seat of the Buthidaung Township. Buthidaung lies on the west bank of the Mayu river, and experienced severe flooding in June 2010 and July 2011. Buthidaung is 16 miles south from Maungdaw. The two towns are connected by two tunnels through the Mayu mountains that were built in 1918.

During the 2016–17 Northern Rakhine State clashes, three police stations in Buthidaung were reportedly surrounded by Rohingya insurgents. As a result of the clashes Buthidaung, and much of the surrounding area, many Rohingyas have left their homes.

Geography
Buthidaung is one of the 16 towns in Rakhine state. Buthidaung is situated about 16 miles from Maungdaw, and similarly to this town has no train station or airport.

History
Buthidaung has a majority Rohingya population, of which many have fled since the 2012 Rakhine State riots. Buthidaung has the second largest population of Rohingya after Maung Daw.

References

External links
 Satellite map at Maplandia.com

Populated places in Rakhine State
Township capitals of Myanmar